Luís dos Reis Goncalves (born 1 February 1962) is a Brazilian football manager, currently in charge of .

Managerial statistics

References

External links 
 Luis dos Reis Goncalves - profile at Lamontville Golden Arrows Football Club

1962 births
Living people
Brazilian football managers
Campeonato Brasileiro Série C managers
Botafogo Futebol Clube (SP) managers
Associação Atlética Caldense managers
Clube Náutico Marcílio Dias managers
Esporte Clube Primavera managers
São José Esporte Clube managers
Camboriú Futebol Clube managers
Associação Atlética Portuguesa (Santos) managers
Associação Atlética Internacional (Limeira) managers
Marília Atlético Clube managers
Sociedade Esportiva Matonense managers
Rio Claro Futebol Clube managers
Associação Esportiva Velo Clube Rioclarense managers
Sociedade Imperatriz de Desportos managers
J2 League managers
Ventforet Kofu managers
Brazilian expatriate football managers
Brazilian expatriate sportspeople in Japan
Brazilian expatriate sportspeople in South Africa
Expatriate football managers in Japan
Brasília Futebol Clube managers